Statement of Regret is a play by black British actor and playwright Kwame Kwei-Armah. The play premiered in the National Theatre's Cottesloe Theatre, London, in 2007, directed by Jeremy Herrin.

Synopsis
Kwaku Mackenzie, founder of a Black policy think tank, hits the bottle after his father's death. As media interest in the once dynamic Institute fades, his team grows fractious and then, disastrously, he favours a young Oxford scholar over his own devastated son. When, in a vain attempt to regain influence, he publicly champions division within the Black community, the consequences are shattering.

Original cast
Don Warrington - Kwaku Mackenzie
Colin McFarlane - Michael Akinbola
Chu Omambala - Idrissa Adebayo
Angel Coulby - Issimama Banjoko
Ellen Thomas - Lola Mackenzie
Javone Prince - Kwaku Mackenzie Junior
Trevor Laird - Val
Clifford Samuel - Adrian Mackenzie
Oscar James - Soby

References

External links
 Official website of production
 Kwame Kwei-Armah: "Why I'm willing to be unfashionable in the search for true definition", The Telegraph, 10 November 2007.

2007 plays
English plays
Plays about race and ethnicity
Plays set in England